Gorczyca Lock - Eighth lock on the Augustów Canal (from the Biebrza). Located in the village of Gorczyca.

Built in 1828 by Eng. Jerzy Arnold. In 1944, she was damaged by the Home Army during the action diversion. Rebuilt from the devastation of World War II in the years 1947 - 1948 and 1954. Another major renovation was completed in 2003 thanks to him lock regained its original appearance and design.

 Location: 57 km canal
 Level difference: 2.81 m
 Length: 43.23 m
 Width: 5.95 m
 Gates: Wooden
 Year built: 1828
 Construction Manager: Eng. Jerzy Arnoldl

References

 
 
 

19th-century establishments in Poland
Gorczyca